The RTÉ Documentary on One, or Doc on One, is an anthology documentary radio series broadcast by Irish public service broadcaster Raidió Teilifís Éireann's Radio 1 since the 1940s. Episodes are typically 45 minutes in length. A related series, The Curious Ear features episodes of c. 10 minutes duration.

The series' archives, featuring more than 1,700 individual episodes, are available from its website.

References

External links
 

Anthology radio series
Radio documentaries
RTÉ Radio 1 programmes